Khak-i Jabbar is a village and the center of Khaki Jabbar District, Kabul Province, Afghanistan.

See also 
Kabul Province

References

Populated places in Kabul Province